Vagif Rakhmanov (1940) is an Azerbaijani sculptor and graphic artist, Honored Artist of Kazakhstan (1981), and recipient of a Lifetime Achievement Award in Arts and Culture awarded by the Consulate of Azerbaijan to Kazakhstan. In March, 2018 Rakhmanov was awarded the President's Highest Honour Medal by the President of Azerbaijan, Ilham Aliyev for his contribution in sculpture to the arts and culture of the Republic of Azerbaijan.

Biography
Vagif Rakhmanov was born on March 12, 1940, in the Mardakan township near Baku to goldsmith Yusuf Oglui and Hadisha Rahmanzadeh. He was the youngest of ten siblings in a family of artists, sculptors, musicians and architects. Vagif Rakhman graduated with A Master of Fine Arts Degree from Surikov Moscow University of Fine Arts in 1970. Since 1964 he has exhibited in more than 135 International Shows in Europe, Kazakhstan and Canada including 18 solo exhibitions in Kazakhstan, Europe, Canada and the USA. In 1981 he was awarded a title of Honored National Artist of Kazakhstan. He is nationally recognised as one of the fathers of Kazakhstan's contemporary sculpture movement.

Personal life

Vagif Rakhmanov is the youngest brother of Azeri painter and People’s Artist of Azerbaijan Maral Rahmanzadeh . From 1987 to 2001 Rakhmanov was married to award winning Russian-Canadian sculptor and film scenic artist Marina Reshetnikova. He is the father of Canadian singer songwriter and visual artist Deniz Reno, Kazakh-German painter Nargis Rakhmanova-Dressler  and Kazakh artisan Aigul Rakhmanova.

References

1940 births
Artists from Baku
Azerbaijani sculptors
Soviet sculptors
Living people
Moscow School of Painting, Sculpture and Architecture alumni